Rubellimicrobium mesophilum is a Gram-negative, mesophilic and motile bacterium from the genus of Rubellimicrobium which has been isolated from soil from Bigeum Island in Korea.

References 

Rhodobacteraceae
Bacteria described in 2008